Hugh de Benin (Benham or Benhyem) (d. 1282) was bishop of Aberdeen. He succeeded Richard Pottock in the see in 1272.

Name
If his name represents Benholm, then he may have come from an English or Anglo-Norman family recently settled in the Mearns (i.e. Kincardineshire), as the name is linguistically English, unusual in settlement names for the area in this period; the other possibility is that the name "Benholm" is an anglicized corruption of a Gaelic name in Beinn, a possibility strengthened by the spellings Benne and Benin found in the cartulary of Arbroath Abbey. He may have been related to the Christiana Benin who married into the Lundie family of Fife.

Career
Hugh chose an ecclesiastical career and by 1266, if not before, he was Chancellor of the diocese of Aberdeen. His career moved forward further in the early 1270s when, after the death of the previous bishop, the chapter and dean of Aberdeen elected him as the new Bishop of Aberdeen. The decree of election was relayed to the pope by Hugh's proctors Thomas de Benin, a likely brother or relative of Hugh and his successor as Chancellor, and Roger de Castello. Hugh was consecrated at Orvieto by Pope Gregory X between 27 March and 23 July 1272.

Shortly after his return to Scotland he was made arbiter of a dispute about tithes between the clergy and the laity of the kingdom, and in a provincial council held at Perth was successful in effecting an arrangement of the difference.

Bishop Hugh was one of the bishops of Scotland attending the Council of Lyons in 1274. Hugh was a trusted figure with both Pope Gregory and Pope Nicholas III, and was appointed several times to judge for the Pope the fitness of different Scottish bishops-elect. He was one of the most active of contemporary Scottish bishops, heading a provincial council at Perth, enjoying a good relationship with the Earl of Buchan, Alexander Comyn, and commencing new work on St Machar's Cathedral.

He died early in 1282 on an island in lacus de Gowlis (Loch Goul, now called Bishops Loch) in the parish of New Machar), where the bishops had their lodging before the canonry was erected.  According to Boethius, the bishop died of the cold (catarrho exundate subito interiit), according to another account he choked (suffocatus fuit), and still another by an ambush or to some other kind of treachery (insidiis occubuit).

Hugh de Benin was the author of Provincialium Statutorum Sanctiones and Novæ Episcoporum Prærogativæ.

See also

Notes

Attribution

References
 Dowden, John, The Bishops of Scotland, ed. J. Maitland Thomson, (Glasgow, 1912)
 Keith, Robert, An Historical Catalogue of the Scottish Bishops: Down to the Year 1688, (London, 1924)
 Summerson, Henry, "Bennum, Hugh of (d. 1281/2)", in the Oxford Dictionary of National Biography, Oxford University Press, 2004 retrieved 21 Feb 2007
 Watt, D.E.R., Fasti Ecclesiae Scotinanae Medii Aevi ad annum 1638, 2nd Draft, (St Andrews, 1969)

13th-century births
1282 deaths
Bishops of Aberdeen
People from Kincardine and Mearns
13th-century Scottish Roman Catholic bishops
Year of birth unknown